Rohde is a surname, and may refer to:

 Brigitte Rohde (born 1954), East-German athlete
 David S. Rohde (born 1967), American journalist
 David W. Rohde (born 1944), American political scientist
 Dennis Rohde (born 1986), German politician
 Eduard Rohde (1828-1883), German composer
 Eleanour Sinclair Rohde (1880-1948), British gardener
 Erwin Rohde (1845-1898), German classical scholar
 Gabriele Rohde (1904–1946), Danish League of Nations official
 Gilbert Rohde, American furniture designer
 Hans Rohde (1914-1979), German footballer
 Helmut Rohde (1925-2016), German politician 
 Herman C. Rohde, Jr., "Nature Boy" Buddy Rogers, (1921-1992), professional wrestler
 Hubert Rohde, German politician
 Jens Rohde, Danish politician
 Joe Rohde, executive at Walt Disney Imagineering
 Johan Rohde, Danish artist and designer
 Klaus Rohde, German biologist
 Leonard Emil Rohde (born 1938), American football player
 Lothar Rohde, German businessman, founder of Rohde & Schwarz
 Małgorzata Rohde, Polish member of parliament for the Conservative People's Party
 Michael Rohde (footballer) (1894-1979), Danish footballer
 Michael Rohde (chess player) (born 1959), American chess grandmaster
 Michael Rohde (botanist) (1782-1812), German botanist
 Peter Rohde (born 1964), Australian footballer
 Peter Rohde, Danish swimmer
 Shelley Rohde (1933-2007), British journalist and author

German toponymic surnames